"I Cut Like a Buffalo" is the third track from the album Horehound, by the alternative rock group The Dead Weather in 2009. It was also released as the third single from the album (after "Hang You from the Heavens" and "Treat Me Like Your Mother."). Jack White is the sole writer of this song.

It has been remixed (but not released commercially) by popular dubstep producer Skream. It has also been remixed by Gramatik, who falls under various genres.

The B side "A Child of a Few Hours Is Burning to Death" is a cover originally done by 60's garage-psych band The West Coast Pop Art Experimental Band.

Videos
The single has two music videos, both of which were directed by Jack White. The first video was not allowed to be shown in the UK because it contains images of people choking and dancers holding knives in a threatening manner. White was forced to release the second video, which he originally intended to be a secret video for his own use, to replace the original and be shown in the United Kingdom. The second video is a second shorter than the first. For a few months however, the video did receive moderate airplay on Australian video show Rage. Olivia Jean, Shelby Lynne and Ruby Rogers from The Black Belles appear in this video.

Track listing

7 inch
The following tracks appear on the 7 inch version of the single.

Nokia Music exclusive

Personnel
 Alison Mosshart – guitar, vocals
 Dean Fertita – organ, guitar
 Jack Lawrence – bass
 Jack White – drums, vocals, production

References

The Dead Weather songs
2009 singles
Songs written by Jack White
Third Man Records singles
2009 songs